Karlo Erak (born April 19, 1995) is a Croatian professional water polo player. He is a former player of VK Solaris. He is 6 ft 1 in (1.85 m) tall and weighs 205 lb (93 kg). His brother, Vice Erak, is also water polo player.

References

External links 
VATERPOLSKA OBITELJ Erakovi se opet okupljaju u Crnici: Sestra i brat sada su na istoj adresi – Franka je u Viktoriji, a Karlo se iz splitskog Mornara vratio u Solaris

1995 births
Living people
Croatian male water polo players